Pernell Whitaker vs. Gary Jacobs, billed as "Summer's Blockbuster" was a professional boxing match contested on August 26, 1995 for the WBC and lineal welterweight titles.

Background
In his previous fight, Pernell Whitaker had won the WBA super welterweight from Julio César Vásquez to become the fourth man to win world titles in four different weight classes. Immediately following the victory, Whitaker would vacate the super welterweight title and announced that he would return to the welterweight division to make a mandatory defense of his WBC welterweight title against Gary Jacobs. Jacobs was the number-one ranked welterweight contender by the WBC but was not viewed as a serious threat to Whitaker and was instilled as a 20–1 underdog. When Whitaker was asked about his quality of opponent, he stated "I don't pick and choose who I fight. This is something I have to do if I'm going to represent the WBC."

Then-WBA welterweight champion Ike Quartey was originally scheduled to defend his title against Andrew Murray on the undercard, but Quartey instead made the defense in France three days prior.

The fight
Whitaker got off to a sluggish start as Jacobs did well leading with his jab and slipping Whitaker's punches. However, Whitaker would eventually take control from the fifth round on. In the 11th round, Jacobs was incorrectly credited with a knockdown after Whitaker missed with a wild left hook and his momentum sent him to the canvas after Jacobs had tapped him on his body with a right, though replays showed that it should have been ruled a slip. In the 12th and final round, Whitaker would score two knockdowns in the final 30 seconds, first dropping Jacobs face first on the canvas following a left hand. After Jacobs got back up with 10 seconds remaining, Whitaker quickly attack and sent him down again with another left. Jacobs would again get back up just as the bell rang to end the fight and the fight would go to the scorecards. All three scorecards were lopsided in Whitaker's favor, who won unanimously with scores of 118–109, 118–107 and 117–109. 

Following the fight, Whitaker admitted that then-IBF super middleweight Roy Jones Jr., who was commentating the fight for HBO, had suggested to Whitaker to attack Jacobs with body punches, stating "It took me four or five rounds to figure out what in the world Gary Jacobs was doing, Roy Jones was mouthing to me that I needed to work the body more. Hey, my corner does a great job, but I could use a little help in there."

Fight card

References

1995 in boxing
1995 in sports in New Jersey
Boxing on HBO
August 1995 sports events in the United States
Boxing matches at Boardwalk Hall